The Some Institutes for Advanced Study (SIAS) consortium organizes ten  "institutes for advanced study" founded on the same principles as the Institute for Advanced Study in Princeton. The members are:
 Institute for Advanced Study in Princeton, New Jersey
 Center for Advanced Study in the Behavioral Sciences in Stanford, California
 National Humanities Center in North Carolina
 Radcliffe Institute for Advanced Study in Cambridge, Massachusetts
 Netherlands Institute for Advanced Study in Amsterdam, the Netherlands
 Swedish Collegium for Advanced Study in Uppsala, Sweden
 Berlin Institute for Advanced Study in Berlin, Germany
 Israel Institute for Advanced Studies in Jerusalem, Israel
 Nantes Institute for Advanced Study Foundation in Nantes, France
 Stellenbosch Institute for Advanced Study in Stellenbosch, South Africa

Overview 
SIAS members were founded explicitly to follow the Princeton model (with certain variations—not all maintain a permanent faculty, for instance), and place an emphasis on granting one-year fellowships. According to Bjorn Wittrock (2003), the Princeton institute model was "like a traditional university . . . devoted to the promotion of learning, but its scale was smaller and it did not offer formal instruction. Nor did it have large laboratories. It was to be a place for the most highly specialised research, yet provide an atmosphere
open to intellectual exchange across all disciplinary boundaries".

The SIAS consortium has stated several conditions any candidate institution should fulfill in order to be accepted as a new member:
 "It should be a true place for advanced study in terms of a commitment to the highest standards of scholarship",
 "It must offer a genuine and competitive fellowship programme - and, one may add, a programme where each individual candidate is subjected to a thorough assessment, not just accepted as part of a thematic group of scholars or selected by the convener of such a group",
 "Its funding should be stable enough to ensure that it will continue to operate into the foreseeable future", and
 "The institution should be part of the academic system but be independent and not be narrowly directed by any single university, or by any commercial enterprise or government department".

References 

Institute for Advanced Study
Consortia